The PS Speicher is a transport museum in Einbeck, Germany. It features the world's largest collection of German motorcycles, as well as vintage cars, and shows the development of individual transport.

History
In 1898, a granary was built in Einbeck from brick stone material. In the second half of the 20th century, it was taken out of usage as more modern granaries were constructed in the region. For several years, it was then used for different purposes. In 2012, a major restoration was initiated. It is now a cultural heritage building. PS Speicher opened by mid 2014 after being declared open by Stephan Weil in an opening ceremony.

Exhibitions
PS Speicher comprises six floors, each of which covers a certain time period. While the highest floor depicts the beginning of individual motorisation with the first motorcycles and cars, the lowest floor addresses current research and possible developments of individual transport technology. All stages in between these two are covered in the remaining four floors. 
Vehicles are presented in full size dioramas within scenes of historic events. In addition, an exhibition of historic supermini cars refers to Wirtschaftswunder time.

The exhibition as well as audio tours are bilingual, German and English.

It includes the  exhibition building with children's playground, ticket pavilion, a six degrees of freedom driving simulator with Porsche chassis that is unique in Germany, a restaurant and the museum shop which sells a wide range of reproduction posters, models, gifts and souvenirs.

Collections

It displays a range of more than 300 German classic motorcycles and antique cars. Exhibits range from one of the earliest motorcycles to the fastest motorcycles that were built to stock. Not all of the museums vehicles are on display at a time.

Notable exhibits include a Hildebrand & Wolfmüller motorcycle, first generation scooters and IFA F9 or Panhard cars.

External links
Official website

Einbeck
Museums in Lower Saxony
Culture of Lower Saxony
Automobile museums in Germany
Motorcycle museums in Germany
Technology museums in Germany
Transport museums in Germany
Historic house museums in Germany
Tourist attractions in Lower Saxony